2013 Denmark Open is a darts tournament, which took place in Denmark in 2013.

Results

Last 32

Last 16

References

2013 in darts
2013 in Danish sport
Darts in Denmark